Cyril Mowbray Wells (21 March 1871 – 22 August 1963) was an English cricketer, rugby footballer and schoolmaster.

Educated at Dulwich College and Trinity College, Cambridge, Wells played first-class cricket for Cambridge University, Surrey and  Middlesex and was a top class rugby player. He was also a housemaster and cricket coach at Eton College, becoming the first Honorary Member of the Eton Ramblers Cricket Club.

Wells was a notable rugby player. He played for Cambridge University R.U.F.C. in the Varsity match in 1891 and 1892, and in six matches for the England national rugby union team from 1893 to 1897. His also played at club level for Harlequins and county level for Middlesex.

References

External links

 

1871 births
1963 deaths
Alumni of Trinity College, Cambridge
Cambridge University cricketers
Cambridge University R.U.F.C. players
England international rugby union players
English cricketers
English rugby union players
Gentlemen cricketers
Harlequin F.C. players
Middlesex County RFU players
Middlesex cricketers
North v South cricketers
People from St Pancras, London
Rugby union players from London Borough of Camden
Surrey cricketers